Same as it Never Was is a novel by Claire Scovell LaZebnik which was published in 2003. In 2006, the novel was adapted into the TV movie Hello Sister, Goodbye Life starring Lacey Chabert and Wendie Malick.

Quotations
" An amazingly assured first novel full of dry wit, an observant eye, and a lot of heart.  LaZebnik's heroine pushes all the emotional buttons-you hate her, you relate to her, you root for her, and, above all, you laugh at her hilarious one-liners. This is a romance with bite, and I enjoyed every morsel."
-Jane Heller, author of Lucky Stars and The Secret Ingredient

"Claire LaZebnik has written an amazingly surefooted, witty, and delicious novel, romantic and smart. A pure pleasure"
-Beth Gutcheon, author of More Than You Know

External links

2003 American novels

American novels adapted into films

fr:Ma sœur, ce boulet